Icon Theatre is a Kent-based UK touring theatre company producing visual and physical theatre. Icon theatre is run by co-founder Nancy Hirst (artistic) and Sally Armstrong (administrative).

Productions
 Release, 2011, about 3 young people newly released from prison, winner of a Fringe First Award at Edinburgh Festival Fringe and was awarded five stars by FringeReview 
 Hard Times, Warehouse Theatre, 2008. 
 Gradgrind, UK Tour, 2008.
 The Odyssey, UK Tour, 2007.
 The Canterbury Tales, UK Tour, 2006.
 Skeleton Woman, Lady Death, BAC Festival of Visual Theatre, 2004.
 The Men's Room, by Joshua James, Warehouse Theatre, 2002.

Reception
 'Icon has achieved something remarkable...this is a theatrical treat' - The Stage.
 'Fantastic - a fun evening out' - London Evening Standard.
 'Inventive, funny & interesting' - Time Out.

References

Non-profit organisations based in the United Kingdom
Theatre companies in the United Kingdom
Touring theatre